Matthew Beard Jr. (January 1, 1925 – January 8, 1981) was an American actor. As a child actor, he was most famous for portraying the character of Stymie in the Our Gang short films from 1930 to 1935. The role was so high-profile that he adopted the name Stymie Beard, being credited as such in some later roles, such as his 1978 appearance in The Buddy Holly Story.

Early life
Matthew Beard Jr. was born near Los Angeles, California. His father was Matthew Beard, and his mother was Johnnie Mae Beard (née Clay). His father was the founding pastor of Beloved Church of God in Christ in Los Angeles.

Our Gang years
Beard previously played baby parts in many films, then signed a five-year contract to play in Our Gang. In contrast to Farina, the character he replaced, Stymie was a slick-tongued con-artist who always was self-assured, nonchalant, and ready with a sly comment as well as clever ideas to solve the problems he faced. Stymie could offer sound, common sense that helped resolve the dilemmas of his playmates. The character's trademark was a bald head crowned by an oversize derby hat, a gift to Beard from comedian Stan Laurel, who had worked under Our Gang creator Hal Roach. Stymie is the only member of Our Gang who both replaced one of the original gang members (Allen "Farina" Hoskins) and was in turn replaced by one who stayed until the series disbanded: Billie "Buckwheat" Thomas.

The name Stymie was provided by Our Gang director Robert McGowan, who always was frustrated (stymied) by little Matthew's curious wanderings around the studio; the character originally was to be named Hercules. McGowan later recalled that Stymie was his favorite of all the Our Gang kids. The then five-year-old Beard came to the series a year after the transition from the silent/early sound era. He had the distinction of being with the gang from the sound movies of the early 1930s through the transitional period in the mid-1930s.

In 1934 Beard was loaned out from Hal Roach Studios to Samuel Goldwyn Productions for Eddie Cantor's Kid Millions. He and other Our Gang kids appear in the "ice cream fantasy sequence".

Family
Beard's paycheck helped support his family in East Los Angeles, including 13 brothers and sisters. After Beard renamed his younger brother Bobbie "Cotton" (which was used as the name of one of the Our Gang characters), his parents allowed him to name all of the rest of his siblings as they were born. He named one Dickie after Dickie Moore, another member of Our Gang. Four other members of the Beard family appeared in the Our Gang comedies:
 His younger sister Betty Jane Beard preceded Stymie in the gang, playing Farina's little brother Hector in Moan & Groan, Inc. and When the Wind Blows (even though she was a girl).
 His younger sister Carlena Beard appeared as Stymie's younger sister in Shiver My Timbers, Readin' and Writin', and For Pete's Sake!.
 His younger brother Bobbie Beard appeared in six Our Gang shorts from 1932 to 1934 as Stymie's younger brother "Cotton."
 His mother Johnnie Mae Beard had a cameo as Stymie's mother in Big Ears and Free Wheeling.

Beard's younger brother Renee Beard appeared in Hal Roach's featurettes of the 1940s Curley and Who Killed Doc Robbin.

Later years
After Beard left the series in 1935 at the age of 10, he acted in minor roles in feature films, such as Captain Blood (1935) and Jezebel (1938). At the age of 15, he made an appearance as Mose the bellboy in the 1940 The Return of Frank James.  By the time he was in high school, he had retired from acting.

Falling into drug use and street life, Beard became addicted to heroin. He spent most of his early adult life in and out of jail on drug and theft charges.

In the 1960s, he checked himself into Synanon, a drug rehabilitation facility and cult in Los Angeles and successfully ended his heroin use. After leaving Synanon, he made a small comeback, appearing in small roles in feature films and episodes of television shows such as Sanford and Son, Emergency!, and The Jeffersons as a guest star (including two episodes of Maude as a resident of an apartment complex where the title character's husband temporarily lived) and Good Times where he had a recurring role (1974–1977) as Monty.

In 1978, he appeared in the film The Buddy Holly Story as a member of the backstage crew at the Apollo Theatre, wearing his trademark bowler hat.

Beard traveled around the country, giving lectures on drug-abuse awareness.

Death
Beard suffered a stroke on January 3, 1981 (two days after his 56th birthday), sustained head injuries from falling down a flight of stairs, and died of pneumonia on January 8, 1981. He was living in Los Angeles at the time of his death.

He is interred in the Evergreen Cemetery in Los Angeles, buried with the famous derby hat he wore all his life.

Filmography

Legacy
The book series Captain Underpants has one of the kids named George Beard. The author Dav Pilkey loved Our Gang, so he named the said character's last name after Beard.

References

Additional reading
 Holmstrom, John. The Moving Picture Boy: An International Encyclopaedia from 1895 to 1995, Norwich, Michael Russell, 1996, p. 132.
 Dye, David. Child and Youth Actors: Filmography of Their Entire Careers, 1914-1985. Jefferson, NC: McFarland & Co., 1988, pp. 13–14.
 Willson, Dixie. Little Hollywood Stars, Akron, OH, and New York: Saalfield Pub. Co., 1935.

External links

 
 
 
 

1925 births
1981 deaths
African-American male actors
American male child actors
African-American male child actors
American male television actors
Deaths from pneumonia in California
Hal Roach Studios actors
20th-century American male actors
Burials at Evergreen Cemetery, Los Angeles
American male comedy actors
Our Gang
20th-century African-American people